The Botanischer Garten der Stadt Neuss is a municipal botanical garden located at the intersection of Weingartstrasse and Körnerstrasse, Neuss, North Rhine-Westphalia, Germany. It is open weekdays without charge.

The garden was established in the early 20th century, and is a small park with flowers, shrubs, and uncommon trees, as well as two aviaries and a small pond. Its greenhouses contain over 100 varieties of cactus and succulents, as well as orchids and bromeliads.

See also 
 List of botanical gardens in Germany

External links 
 Botanischer Garten der Stadt Neuss
 Neusser-Marktplatz: description with picture
 Qype entry

Neuss, Botanischer Garten der Stadt
Neuss
Neuss, Botanischer Garten der Stadt